Wynn Harmon (born in Upper St. Clair, Pennsylvania), is an American stage and television actor.

Credits

Broadway
On Broadway he played The Detective in Porgy and Bess (also telecast Live from Lincoln Center on PBS).

Off Broadway
Off-Broadway credits include:
 As You Like It
 The premiere of Tibet Does Not Exist

Regional
Regional credits include:
Lost in the Stars at Washington National Opera, Kennedy Center Washington DC
Show Boat at Washington National Opera, Kennedy Center Washington DC
Camelot at Glimmerglass Festival
Carousel at Glimmerglass FestivalAriadne in Naxos at Glimmerglass Festival
Lost in the Stars at Glimmerglass Festival
The Music Man at Glimmerglass Festival and Royal Opera House of Muscat, Oman
Hamlet at Shakespeare on the Sound
The Hound of the Baskervilles at New Jersey Repertory Theatre
The Habit of Art at The Studio Theatre Washington DC
The Alchemist, Love's Labor's Lost at The Shakespeare Theatre Washington DC
Hamlet at Pioneer Theatre Company Salt Lake City, Utah
Cymbeline, Romeo and Juliet, A Midsummer Night's Dream, Pride and Prejudice at Orlando Shakespeare Festival
The 39 Steps at The Depot Theatre Westport, New York
God of Carnage at Hartford TheatreWorks
The Heidi Chronicles at Arena Stage
A Moon for the Misbegotten at Long Wharf Theatre, Hartford Stage and The Alley Theatre
The Constant Wife, Pericles, Macbeth, The Comedy of Errors, The Winter's Tale, Othello, A Midsummer Night's Dream, Titus Andronicus, Romeo and Juliet, Merry Wives of Windsor, All's Well That Ends Well  at The Old Globe Theatre
Sylvia and Travels with My Aunt at Virginia Stage and Syracuse Stage;
The Way of the World at Huntington Theatre Company;
The West End Horror and A Christmas Carol at Bay Street Theatre;
Me and My Girl at Candlewood Playhouse
Scrooge in A Christmas Carol at the Westport Country Playhouse;
1776, Anything Goes, Moon Over Buffalo,  Noises Off, Murderers and Scotland Road at Riverside Theatre in Vero Beach
Time of My Life, Balmoral, Tartuffe, The Mousetrap and Moon Over Buffalo at Depot Theatre
Much Ado About Nothing; Romeo and Juliet at Hudson Valley Shakespeare Festival 
Our Town at Two River Theatre.
Private Lives at Palm Beach Dramaworks

Television
 Trevor Babcock on All My Children
 Mark in the film Paper Cranes

References

1960 births
Living people
People from Upper St. Clair Township, Allegheny County, Pennsylvania
American male actors
Boston University alumni